Shrewsbury Barrow is a Bronze Age burial mound (also known as a tumulus) in Shooter's Hill in South East London, in the Royal Borough of Greenwich. It is a Scheduled Monument.

History
The Shrewsbury Barrow is named after the 15th Earl of Shrewsbury, who built nearby Shrewsbury House in 1789 (that Shrewsbury House was demolished, and, in 1923, replaced by the existing building of the same name). The barrow is adjacent to Shrewsbury Park.

It is the only surviving barrow of a group of six; or possibly two groups of three. The other barrows were destroyed during the development of the surrounding estate in the 1930s. The barrows are located at the top of the hill, and would have been visible from the foot of the hill, silhouetted against the sky.

The only detailed description of the lost burial mounds is that of Col AH Bagnold in the parish magazine of Christ Church, Shooter's Hill. The Shrewsbury Barrow is No 1 in Bagnold's list. Tower House has been demolished, but, in his childhood, the future cabinet minister Douglas Jay lived there, and he recalled playing on the tumulus as a child. Bagnold's optimism about the future prospects of No 6 was misplaced.

Location
It is located on the corners of Brinklow Crescent and Plum Lane. It is approximately 25m wide and 1.5m high.

Nearby burial mounds
There were other burial mounds nearby, and a small number remain, including the one on Winn's Common (No 7 in Bagnold's list) and a badly damaged one in Lesnes Abbey Woods.

References

Parks and open spaces in the Royal Borough of Greenwich
Stone Age sites in England
Barrows in the United Kingdom